William Hall Walker, 1st Baron Wavertree   (25 December 1856 – 2 February 1933) was a British businessman, Conservative Party politician, art collector, and an important figure in thoroughbred racehorse breeding.

Background
Walker was a younger son of Sir Andrew Barclay Walker, 1st Baronet, a wealthy brewer born in Ayrshire who expanded the family business to England and moved to live in Gateacre, Liverpool, by his wife Eliza Reid of Limekilns, Fife. He was the younger brother of John Reid Walker.

Thoroughbred horse racing
A lover of horses, Walker was a polo player and in 1895 built stables near Liverpool for his polo ponies at what is now known as Grange Mews. Although he began racing horses, he is best remembered as a breeder and the person who introduced English racing to the Aga Khan III. As an owner his most memorable victory was that of The Soarer in the 1896 Grand National.  He also won four Classics.

Irish National Stud
In 1900, Walker purchased the lands around Tully, Kildare town in County Kildare where he established a highly successful stud farm. He acquired a number of foundation mares that led to the breeding of such horses as Prince Palatine and 1906 Epsom Derby winner, Minoru. Between the years 1906 and 1910, he created a Japanese garden that is acclaimed as the finest of its kind in Europe and today is a major tourist attraction.

In 1916, Walker gifted his stud to the British Government for the purpose of founding a British National Stud. In 1943, the newly formed Irish Government acquired the property and the Irish National Stud Company Ltd. was formed.

The National Stud
In 1916, Walker gifted his entire bloodstock to the British government with the idea of creating a National Stud. As part of the arrangement, the government acquired his stud farm in Ireland that became the basis for both the Irish National Stud and The National Stud of the United Kingdom now located in Newmarket. Wavertree House at the National Stud and its Wavertree Charitable Trust is named in Walker's memory.

In 1999, the Racing Post ranked him at number 24 on its list of Top 100 Makers of 20th Century Horse Racing.

Art collection
Walker's father was not an art collector but donated the Walker Art Gallery to the city of Liverpool.  He would acquire a substantial collection of his own, among them the painting View of Killarney with the Passage to the Upper Lake by William Ashford, one of Ireland's leading landscape artists. In 1933, he bequeathed the Walker Art Gallery a sizeable part of his paintings collection plus £20,000 to help the museum with its renovations. In addition, he donated a number of paintings from his collection of sporting art to The National Stud which are on display at Wavertree House.

Politics and the Peerage
In 1900, Walker was elected as the Member of Parliament (MP) for Widnes. He served until resigning on 18 August 1919. On 27 October 1919 he was raised to the peerage as Baron Wavertree, of Delamere in the County of Chester. On his death in 1933, the barony became extinct. He was also appointed a deputy lieutenant of the County of Lancashire on 15 June 1910. This gave him the Post Nominal Letters "DL" for Life. He held the appointment until the Mandatory retirement age of 75 on 25 December 1931 at which point he was transferred to the retired list.

In his honor, the Lord Wavertree Cup is offered in English FA football (By way of the Liverpool County Premier League). His widow, a direct descendant of the playwright Richard Brinsley Sheridan, was also an avid sports person who sponsored lawn tennis tournaments and offered the International Tennis Federation a trophy that was declined but later was initiated as the Davis Cup.

References

Sources
 Biography for William Hall Walker's father,  Andrew Barclay Walker
 National Horseracing Museum profile of Lord Wavertree
 William Hall Walker at the Irish National Stud official website

External links 
 

Wavertree, William Hall Walker, 1st Baron
Wavertree, William Hall Walker, 1st Baron
Wavertree, William Hall Walker, 1st Baron
Wavertree, William Hall Walker, 1st Baron
Wavertree, William Hall Walker, 1st Baron
Wavertree, William Hall Walker, 1st Baron
Walker, William
Wavertree, William Hall Walker, 1st Baron
Wavertree, William Hall Walker, 1st Baron
Wavertree, William Hall Walker, 1st Baron
Walker, William
Walker, William
Walker, William
Walker, William
Walker, William
UK MPs who were granted peerages
Walker, William
Deputy Lieutenants of Lancashire
Politicians from Liverpool
Barons created by George V